, nicknamed Azuki,  is a Japanese footballer who plays as a midfielder for J2 League club Blaublitz Akita.

Playing career
Ryota Nakamura played for J2 League club; Matsumoto Yamaga FC in 2013 season. On 4 April 2015, he scored his first hat-trick in a 3–0 win over FC Maruyasu Okazaki at Yanmar Field Nagai.Azuki bagged his second career hat-trick, in a 5-0 win against Kamatamare Sanuki on 15 September 2019.

Club statistics
Updated to 29 November 2022.

Honours
 Blaublitz Akita
 J3 League (1): 2020

References

External links
Profile at Yamaga
Profile at Azul Claro Numazu

1991 births
Living people
Chukyo University alumni
Association football people from Aichi Prefecture
Japanese footballers
J2 League players
Japan Football League players
Matsumoto Yamaga FC players
FC Osaka players
Azul Claro Numazu players
Blaublitz Akita players
Association football forwards